Mireia Gutiérrez Cabanes (born 9 October 1988) is an Andorran female  former skier. She represented Andorra in the 2010 Winter Olympics, in the Alpine skiing events. She also took part in the FIS Alpine World Ski Championships 2009.

World Cup results

Results per discipline

World Championship results

Olympic results

Notees

References

External links
 
 
 
 

1988 births
Living people
Andorran female alpine skiers
Olympic alpine skiers of Andorra
Alpine skiers at the 2010 Winter Olympics
Alpine skiers at the 2014 Winter Olympics
Alpine skiers at the 2018 Winter Olympics